Compis (COMPuter I Skolan, also a  pun on the colloquial Swedish word kompis meaning comrade or buddy) was a computer system intended for the general educational system in Sweden and sold to Swedish schools beginning in 1984 through the distributor Esselte Studium, who also was responsible for the software packages. 

The computers were also used in Danish, Finnish and Norwegian schools under the name Scandis.

History 
In 1980, the ABC 80 used in the schools was regarded as becoming obsolete, and Styrelsen för teknisk utveckling (board for technical development) was tasked to find a replacement. In 1981, the procurement Tudis (Teknikupphandlingsprojekt Datorn i Skolan)  was launched, and while the decision was controversial, Svenska Datorer AB  was awarded the contract with development beginning in 1982. After Svenska Datorer went bankrupt, production was transferred to TeliDatorer/Telenova under Televerket (Sweden)
The computer was distributed by Esselte and exclusively marketed towards, and sold to, Swedish, Norwegian and Finnish schools, mainly high stage (year 7-9) and gymnasium-level.

The computer was based on the Intel 80186 CPU and with CP/M-86 as the operating system in ROM (although it could also run MS-DOS from disk). The computer had a wide selection of ports, including one for a light pen. The Compis project was criticized from the start, and as the move to IBM PC compatibility came it was left behind and finally cancelled in 1988 although it was in use well into the 1990s.

Applications 

Notable applications being run on the Compis in an educational environment was:

 COMAL interpreter
 Turbo Pascal 3.0 compiler, under the name Scandis-Pascal
 WordStar word processor
 Harmony software: word processing, spreadsheet and database. The name was a pun on Lotus Symphony, the dominant productivity software at the time.

Some schools had simple local area networks of Compis/Scandis computers, in which 10–20 machines shared one hard disk with a typical capacity of 10MB.

See also 

 Education in Sweden
 Unisys ICON

External links 

 Compis Info: A site dedicated to the Compis
 Telenova Compis: some documentation available here (page in Swedish).

References 
 Nationalencyclopedins nätupplaga, "Compis"
 Swedish Internet museum

Personal computers
Goods manufactured in Sweden